John Eddie "J. J." Jones (April 16, 1952 – July 9, 2009) was an American football quarterback in the National Football League. He was signed by the New York Jets as an undrafted free agent in 1975, the team's first African-American quarterback. He also played with the Calgary Stampeders of the CFL from 1976-77. He played college football at Fisk.

He had three children.

Jones died in a house fire in 2009.

See also
 Racial issues faced by black quarterbacks

References

1952 births
2009 deaths
Fisk University alumni
American football quarterbacks
New York Jets players
Players of American football from Memphis, Tennessee
African-American players of American football
20th-century African-American sportspeople
21st-century African-American people
Deaths from fire in the United States